Communauté d'agglomération Cannes Pays de Lérins is the communauté d'agglomération, an intercommunal structure, centred on the city of Cannes. It is located in the Alpes-Maritimes department, in the Provence-Alpes-Côte d'Azur region, southeastern France. It was created in January 2014. Its area is 94.8 km2. Its population was 158,111 in 2018, of which 73,965 in Cannes proper.

Composition
The communauté d'agglomération consists of the following 5 communes:
Cannes
Le Cannet
Mandelieu-la-Napoule
Mougins
Théoule-sur-Mer

References

Agglomeration communities in France
Intercommunalities of Alpes-Maritimes